Heman is a male given name. Notable people with the name include:

Heman Allen (of Colchester) (1779–1852), U.S. Representative from Colchester, Vermont
Heman Allen (of Milton) (1777–1844), U.S. Representative from Milton, Vermont
Heman Dass, Pakistani politician
Heman L. Dowd (1887–?), American college football player and coach
Heman Edward Drummond (1905–1956), American coal-magnate
Heman Dyer (1810-1900), chancellor of the University of Pittsburgh
Heman Gurung (born 1996), Nepalese international footballer 
Heman Humphrey (1779–1861), American author and clergyman
Heman Lowry  (1778-1848), American politician from Vermont
Heman Luwang (born 1988), Indian cricketer
Heman A. Moore (1809–1844), U.S. Representative from Ohio
Heman J. Redfield (1788–1877), American politician from New York State
Heman C. Smith  (1850–1919), American Ladder-Day Saint leader
Heman R. Smith (1795–1861), American military officer
Heman Marion Sweatt (1912–1982), American civil rights activist
Heman Swift (1733–1814), American Revolutionary War general and Connecticut Supreme Court justice

See also
Heman (disambiguation)
Hemans (disambiguation)